

References

Alloys

Technology-related lists